By Sotheary (born 3 April 1998), also known as Bee, is a Cambodian model and beauty pageant titleholder who won Miss Cambodia 2016. She represented Cambodia at Miss Universe 2017 pageant. She was the first ever Cambodian to participate at Miss Universe.

Pageantry

Miss Cambodia 2016
Sotheary was crowned Miss Cambodia 2016 and competed at Miss Universe 2017.

Miss Universe 2017
Sotheary represented Cambodia at Miss Universe 2017 but unplaced.

References

External links
Miss Cambodia - Official Website

Miss Universe 2017 contestants
1998 births
Living people
Cambodian beauty pageant winners
Cambodian female models
People from Phnom Penh